Confessional is the third studio album by Irish singer-songwriter Janet Devlin. It received a general release via Insomnia Music on 5 June 2020 and marked her first release following the chart success of her second album Running with Scissors almost six years previously.

Background and composition

Following the success of her second album Running with Scissors, it took Devlin four years to write the material that would eventually form her third album. During that time, she released numerous covers on her YouTube channel, including Ed Sheeran's "I See Fire".

All of the songs were written by Devlin in collaboration with other songwriters including Fiona Bevan, Lauren Aquilina and David Sneddon. The album was produced in its entirety by Jonathan Quarmby.

In 2020, before the album's release, she released an extended play named after the album's third single "Honest Men", which contained the title track and two previously released singles, "Confessional" and "Saint of the Sinners".

Critical reception

Confessional received generally positive reviews from critics. Tanis Smither of Hot Press stated that Devlin and Quarmby had found "that happy marriage between pop and traditional" and that the album was "an emotional look into an interesting artist". Nick Smith of musicOMH described the music as "a sterling mix of folk, pop and traditional Irish" and Devlin's voice as "beautiful and assertive", concluding that "Confessional is an honest, brave and knowing cathartic journey, dealing with addiction, self-harm, religion and sexuality. This is a captivating and triumphant work of art from the depth of Devlin's heart and soul." In The Irish Times Tony Clayton-Lea said that sometimes the music did not match the lyrical themes of independence and survival, with "the assertiveness of one undermined by the ineffectiveness of the other", but that overall "Devlin delivers a stinging riposte to the music business as an entity and to some people in particular".

Track listing
Album and track metadata and credits adapted from iTunes and Apple Music. All tracks produced by Jonathan Quarmby.

Personnel
All credits adapted from Qobuz.

 Janet Devlin – vocals
 Jonathan Quarmby – producer, piano, programming, mixing engineer, guitar, bass guitar, low whistle, keyboards, acoustic guitar, backing vocals
 Brian Fleming – bodhr n, percussion
 Nathan Thomas – backing vocals
 Peter Brown – accordion
 Eoin Dillon – uilleann pipes, whistle
 Daniel Bingham – drums
 Michael Giverin – guitar, mandolin, bouzouki
 Anna Mary Donaghy – fiddle
 Gav Skeggs – backing vocals
 Paul Statham – cello, programming
 Ian Burdge – cello
 Anna Phoebe McElligott – violin
 Richard Walker – guitar, harp, acoustic guitar, backing vocals
 Grace Davies – backing vocals
 Oscar Golding – guitar
 Nick Ereaut – double bass
 Rick Chambers – backing vocals
 Jim Molyneux – backing vocals
 Esme Allen-Quarmby – backing vocals
 Poppy Allen-Quarmby – backing vocals
 Harry Harrington – backing vocals
 Sam Odiwe – bass guitar
 Floriane Blancke – harp
 Marc Rapson – backing vocals

References

2020 albums
Albums produced by Jonathan Quarmby
Janet Devlin albums